The 2015 AFL season was the 119th season of the Australian Football League (AFL), the highest level senior Australian rules football competition in Australia, which was known as the Victorian Football League until 1989. The season featured eighteen clubs, ran from 2 April until 3 October, and comprised a 22-game home-and-away season followed by a finals series featuring the top eight clubs.

The premiership was won by the Hawthorn Football Club for the 13th time and third time consecutively, after it defeated  by 46 points in the 2015 AFL Grand Final.

The season was marred by the mid-season death of  senior coach Phil Walsh, who was killed by his son in a domestic incident. Adelaide's following match was cancelled.

Pre-season

All Stars game
The biennial All Stars game, this year played in Western Australia, featuring an AFL team and the Indigenous All Stars team made up of some of the best Indigenous players in the game, returned for the 2015 pre-season. The West Coast Eagles were selected as the AFL team to play in the game, which was played at Medibank Stadium in Perth.

NAB Challenge

For the second consecutive year, the NAB Challenge series took place, featuring 27 practice matches played over 25 days, beginning 26 February and ending 22 March. The matches were stand-alone in nature, with no overall winner crowned for the series. Each team played three pre-season games, many of which were played at suburban or regional venues, with most games televised on Fox Footy. The Super Goal was retained for these matches.

Premiership season
Notable features of the draw include:
To address poor attendances and late-finishing matches, all Saturday night matches on the east coast were brought forward by 20 minutes, with matches in this timeslot now starting at 7:20 pm and Saturday twilight matches were brought forward by five minutes to start at 4:35 pm. Matches in Adelaide and Perth retained their respective local starting times of 7:10 pm and 5:40 pm.
Many of the grounds used by the AFL hosted games in the 2015 Cricket World Cup, which ended on 29 March. Consequently, the season started and finished slightly later than in previous years, with the Grand Final scheduled for the first Saturday in October instead of the customary last Saturday in September.
Due to the Sydney Royal Easter Show, Greater Western Sydney's primary home ground (Spotless Stadium) was unavailable until round 6, therefore the club's first two home games were at its secondary home ground, StarTrack Oval, in rounds 2 and 4.
Mother's Day Round (Round 6) saw six matches played on Saturday instead of the usual five, with only two matches played on Mother's Day itself. This was repeated in round 23, with no twilight game on the Sunday.
The Friday before the Grand Final became a public holiday in Victoria, following an election promise by the incoming state government, under the premiership of Daniel Andrews.
All starting times are local.

Round 1

Round 2

Round 3

Round 4

Round 5

Round 6

Round 7

Round 8

Round 9

Round 10

Round 11

Round 12

Round 13

Round 14

Round 15

Round 16

Round 17

Round 18

Round 19

Round 20

Round 21

Round 22

Round 23

Season notes
 secured the minor premiership for the first time in its history.
 and  finished first and second on the ladder respectively, the first time two teams from the same state outside of Victoria had finished in the top two positions.
 missed the finals for the first time since 2006.
 was the first minor premier to fail to reach the Grand Final since  in 2005.
 became the first team in history to finish the home-and-away season in eighth position and qualify for a preliminary final.
's score of 27.11 (173) against  in round 17 was the highest score posted by any side, while 's score of 4.6 (30) against  in round 23 was the lowest.
Matt Priddis set a new record for most handpasses in a season. Priddis reached a total of 472 handpasses, surpassing the previous record of 445 set by Gary Ablett, Jr. in 2009.
Todd Goldstein set a new record for most hit-outs in a season. Goldstein's final tally of 1,058 surpassed the previous record of 952 set by Gary Dempsey (North Melbourne) in 1982. Aaron Sandilands, who had 998 hit-outs for the season, also passed Dempsey's old record.

Win/loss table

Bold – Home game
X – Bye
C – Cancelled
Opponent for round listed above margin

Ladder

Ladder progression

Finals series

Week one

Week two

Week three

Week four

Attendances

By club

By ground

Awards
The AFL Players Association awards
The AFL Coaches Association Awards
The Lifetime Achievement Award was awarded to David Wheadon.
The Media Award was awarded to Gerard Whateley for his work on Fox Footy and ABC.

Milestones

Coleman Medal

Numbers highlighted in blue indicates the player led the Coleman that round.
Underlined numbers indicates the player did not play that round.

Best and fairest

Club leadership

Coach changes

Club financials

Post-season

International Rules Series

The International Rules Series returned in November 2015, with Ireland entitled to the hosting rights. The match was played on Saturday, 21 November 2015 at Dublin's Croke Park. A highly qualified Australian side, who were looking for back-to-back series wins, fell to a classy Irish team by 4 points.

Notable events and controversies

Doping and drugs
The AFL suffered significant bad publicity during 2015 related to four cases of illicit substance abuse in AFL clubs – three related to doping and one related to recreational drugs:
The Essendon Football Club supplements controversy – relating to the supplements program operating at the Essendon Football Club during the 2011/12 offseason – continued to be heard during the 2015 season. The 34 players implicated in the controversy were served with infraction notices in November 2014, and were provisionally suspended until their hearings at the AFL anti-doping tribunal were complete. In the week before the start of the AFL season, the players were found not guilty and their suspensions were lifted. In May 2015, the World Anti-Doping Agency announced an appeal of the not guilty verdicts to the Court of Arbitration for Sport; this was ultimately heard in early 2016, and resulted in the not guilty verdicts being overturned and many players being suspended for the 2016 season.
Ryan Crowley faced the AFL anti-doping tribunal after having tested positive to a banned substance in a drug test after Fremantle's round 17, 2014 win against Greater Western Sydney. He commenced a provisional suspension commenced after a positive confirmation tests (also known as B-sample) mid September 2014. He appeared before the AFL Tribunal in May 2015, and was found guilty suspended for twelve months, backdated to the beginning of his provisional suspension; he became eligible to play again on 25 September 2015. The banned substance has not been identified, but is understood to have been present in a painkiller which Crowley had taken but which was not prescribed by the club doctor.
Lachlan Keeffe and Josh Thomas (both of ) tested positive to the banned substance clenbuterol in drug tests taken in February 2015. Both accepted provisional suspensions in March and returned positive B-samples in May. Both were handed infraction notices in July and accepted two-year bans in August (backdated to March), in addition they were delisted and fined $50,000 each by Collingwood.
In late June, former  player Karmichael Hunt, who was being investigated by the Queensland Crime and Corruption Commission over allegations of cocaine supply and possession, named several current Gold Coast players as having taken illicit recreational drugs during his time at the club. Although nothing further came from Hunt's allegations, days later, photographs from early 2013 emerged showing Gold Coast's Harley Bennell using speed; and a teammate, whose anonymity is protected under the AFL's drugs policy, self-reported shortly afterwards that he had also been present and taken the drug. Bennell was fined $5000 and suspended for three matches.

Death of Phil Walsh
In the early hours of Friday 3 July 2015,  coach Phil Walsh was found dead at his Adelaide residency following a domestic violence incident; he was killed by his son, Cy, who was charged with his murder, and ultimately found not guilty due to mental incompetence, meaning he is now subject to a lifetime psychiatric supervision order and is permanently detained at the James Nash House forensic Mental Health Facility. Walsh's wife Meredith also suffered injuries in the incident. In the immediate aftermath, the match between Adelaide and Geelong, which was to have been played on Sunday 5 July, was cancelled, with the clubs sharing two premiership points each. At the remaining seven matches of the round ( and  had already played on Thursday night), respect was paid to Walsh by observing moments of silence both before and after the match; and pre- and post-match celebrations or promotions, including the playing of club songs and running through banners, were not carried out.

References

External links
2015 AFL Season Advanced Ladder from AustralianFootball.com

Australian Football League seasons
 
AFL season